Chah Matk (also Romanized as Chāh Matk ) is a village in Rabatat Rurakl District, Kharanaq District, Ardakan County, Yazd Province, Iran. At the 2006 census, its population was 75, in 26 families.

References 

Populated places in Ardakan County